William John ("Billy") Cameron (1878-1955) was a newspaper editor most well known for his work at The Dearborn Independent, where he was responsible for publishing a series of anti-Semitic articles known as "The International Jew". He also was influential in the British Israel movement, helping Howard Rand launch the Anglo-Saxon Federation of America.

Early life
William J. Cameron was born in Hamilton, Ontario, in 1878. His family moved to Michigan for a brief time, but he returned to Canada for high school, and then some courses at the University of Toronto.
In 1904, Cameron began working as a staff reporter at the Detroit News, eventually moving up to become chief editorial writer where he wrote an editorial column called Reflections.

Working for Ford
After being recommended by E.G. Pipp, whom Cameron had worked for at the Detroit News, Henry Ford hired him to work for The Dearborn Independent, a newspaper Ford had purchased.

Working for the Dearborn Independent, Cameron was the principal writer of a series of articles that were later published as the booklet The International Jew. When Pipp left the Independent over the publishing of the anti-Semitic articles, Cameron became chief editor of the paper until it ceased publication in 1927. From the mid-1920s to the early 1940s, he also handled all of Ford's personal press relations.

Cameron also gave a weekly talk on The Ford Sunday Evening Hour, a radio program that ran from October 1934 until March 1942.

British-Israelism
It is not known for certain when Cameron became interested in British-Israelism, but author Michael Barkun speculates that he was raised in the tradition by his father.

Howard Rand had been an organizer the British-Israel World Federation  and in early 1930 he met with Cameron in Detroit to establish a new British-Israel group in the US: the Anglo-Saxon Federation of America. Cameron become the new organization's first president with Suite 601 of the Fox Building in Detroit as the headquarters. Detroit hosted the first convention in May 1930. 

Cameron was also a lay preacher and was known to give lectures on British Israelism. In 1933 he gave a series of lectures at The Dearborn Inn where he posited his view of the Bible as a racial book.

Alcoholism

Mrs. Stanley Ruddiman, a friend of Henry Ford's, suggests that Cameron may have had a drinking problem as early as his days at the Detroit News, believing he started drinking there to be "one of the boys." By the time he started working at Ford, Cameron was most certainly an alcoholic. This made for some conflict with Ford, who was known to be a teetotaler. Ford had concern for Cameron and tried to help prevent him from drinking when he could, providing him an attendant, and medical care at Henry Ford Hospital. Ford viewed Cameron's alcoholism as an illness that could be cured. During the days of Prohibition, when Ford would find out about a place where Cameron would be getting alcohol, Ford would have it closed down.

Cameron's drinking also caused friction with Howard Rand, who had run for Massachusetts state office on the Prohibition Party ticket. It is not clear whether Cameron's drinking problem caused the ultimate breach between them, but Cameron ceased to play a significant role in the federation after the late 1930s, and the headquarters was moved from Detroit where Cameron lived, to Massachusetts where Rand was located.

Unity Church

Seeking help and solace regarding her husband's drinking, Mrs. Cameron had turned to the Missouri-based Unity Church. Following the death of Henry Ford in 1947, Cameron quit drinking altogether, left British-Israelism, and joined Unity Church.

He eventually entered the Unity ministry and in 1949 moved to Oakland, California as an assistant minister, a position he held until his death in 1955.

Books
Economics of the Bible

References

Additional Sources 
 The Reminiscences of Mr. Fred L. Black https://cdm15889.contentdm.oclc.org/digital/collection/p15889coll2/id/2393/

British Israelism
1878 births
1955 deaths
Antisemitism in the United States
20th-century American newspaper editors